Hany Armanious (born 1962) is an Australian artist who lives and works in Sydney. Armanious produces installations and sculptural forms, as well as paintings and drawings.

Life and work
Hany Armanious was born in Ismailia, Egypt and migrated to Australia with his family at the age of 6. He completed his schooling in Australia and holds a Bachelor of Arts (Visual Arts) degree from the City Art Institute, Sydney.

His work has been exhibited in the Contemporary Art Museum St. Louis, Missouri; UCLA Hammer Museum, Los Angeles; Institute of Contemporary Art, Sydney; Monash University Museum of Art, Melbourne; Busan Biennale, Korea; Art Gallery of New South Wales, Sydney; Australian Centre for Contemporary Art, Melbourne; Govett-Brewster Art Gallery, New Plymouth, NZ; Artspace Sydney; Museum of Contemporary Art, Sydney.

Armanious' work is included in the collections of Dakis Joannou Foundation, Athens; National Gallery of Victoria, Melbourne; Monash University Gallery, Melbourne; Newcastle Regional Gallery; Art Gallery of New South Wales, Sydney; National Gallery of Australia, Canberra; Queensland Art Gallery, Brisbane; Museum of Contemporary Art, Sydney; Auckland Art Gallery, New Zealand; Museum of Contemporary Art, San Diego; Ipswich Art Gallery, Queensland; the Chartwell Collection, New Zealand; as well as numerous private collections in Europe, USA and Australia.

References

Further reading
 Armstrong, Fergus and Amanda Rowell. "Selflok", Hany Armanious, 21 August – 28 October 2001, UCLA Hammer Museum, 2001.
 Coates, Rebecca. "Hany Armanious", Uncanny Nature, Australia Centre of Contemporary Art, Melbourne, 2006.
 Desmond, Michael. "Hany Armanious", Broadsheet, vol. 32, no. 3, September – November 2003: 35.
 Dougal Phillips, Review of 'Adventures in Form and Space, Balnaves Foundation Sculpture Project 2006,' Art and Australia, Vol. 44, No. 2, Summer 2006, p. 280.
 Jasper, Adam. "Hany Armanious-Pragmatic metaphysics, painstaking copies and infinite pedestals." Frieze, Issue 114, April 2008: 154–155.
 Jasper, Adam. "Unreality Bites", Art World, Issue 8, April–May 2009: pp 74–80
  Jenks, Debra. "Muckrakers and Mudslingers on 27th St." Chelsea Now, 26 – 1 October 2007: 23.
 Leonard, Robert. "Catalogue of Errors." Morphic Resonance- Hany Armanious. City Gallery, Wellington and Institute of Modern Art, Brisbane, 2007: 20–30.
 Markou, Jason. "The Sorcerer's Crocs", Morphic Resonance- Hany Armanious. City Gallery, Wellington and Institute of Modern Art, Brisbane, 2007
 Markou, Jason. "Hany Armanious", Adventures With Form in Space, Balnaves Foundation Sculpture Project, Art Gallery of New South Wales, Sydney, 2006, pp. 72–82
 Palmer, Daniel, 'Looking Back: Retrospectives,' Frieze, Issue 104, December – January 2007, p. 132
 Smith, Roberta. "Hany Armanious", The New York Times, 23 November 2007: E40.

1962 births
Living people
Australian painters
21st-century Australian sculptors
Australian people of Coptic descent
Egyptian emigrants to Australia
Artists from Sydney
Australian contemporary artists